The North West of Ireland Printing and Publishing Company (NWIPP) is a family-owned newspaper group based in the Irish province of Ulster, both in Northern Ireland and the Republic of Ireland. The company was established in 1901 by the Lynch family with the launch of the Ulster Herald. The company expanded rapidly in the following years adding the Derry People (now Donegal News) and Fermanagh Herald in 1902; and purchased the Strabane Chronicle, which had been established in 1896. The Tyrone Herald was launched in November 2004, and a Monday edition of the Donegal News was also launched in November 2006. The company also publishes the weekly Gaelic games paper, Gaelic Life, starting in January 2007. The company is based in Omagh, County Tyrone. The group's circulation for the first half of 2010 (excluding Gaelic Life) was 53,038, making it one of the largest family-owned newspaper companies in Ireland.

Titles
As of 2022, the publisher's titles include:

*Note: all UK Audit Bureau of Circulations figures for period January to June 2010

References

External links
 NWIPP Homepage (archived 2006)

Mass media in County Londonderry
Mass media in County Donegal
Mass media in County Fermanagh
Mass media in County Tyrone
Mass media companies of Northern Ireland
Newspapers published in Ireland